Michael David Kors (born Karl Anderson Jr. August 9, 1959) is an American fashion designer. He is the chief creative officer of his brand, Michael Kors, which sells men's and women's ready-to-wear, accessories, watches, jewelry, footwear, and fragrance. Kors was the first women's ready-to-wear designer for the French house Celine, from 1997 to 2003. On January 2, 2019, Michael Kors Holdings Limited officially changed its name to Capri Holdings Limited (NYSE: CPRI). Michael Kors, Jimmy Choo, and Versace are the three founder-led brands under Capri Holdings Limited.

Personal life 
Kors was born as Karl Anderson Jr. on Long Island, New York. His mother is Jewish; his father was of Swedish descent. His parents are Joan Hamburger, a former model, and her first husband, Karl Anderson Sr. His mother married Bill Kors, when her son was five, and his surname was changed to Kors. His mother told Karl that he could choose a new first name as well and he renamed himself Michael David Kors. He grew up in Merrick, New York and graduated from John F. Kennedy High School in Bellmore, New York, on Long Island.

Kors married his partner, Lance Le Pere, on August 16, 2011, in Southampton, New York, in The Hamptons.

Career 

Kors' affinity for fashion started when he was very young. His mother thought his affinity might have been caused in part by his exposure to the apparel industry through her modeling career. Michael, at the age of five, even redesigned his mother's wedding dress for her second marriage. As a teen, Kors began designing clothes and selling them out of his parents' basement, which he renamed the Iron Butterfly.

In 1977, he enrolled at the Fashion Institute of Technology in New York City. However, he dropped out after only nine months and took a job at a boutique called Lothar's across from Bergdorf Goodman on 57th Street in Midtown Manhattan, where he started as a salesperson and went on to become both the designer and visual display head for the store.

In 1981, Kors launched his Michael Kors women's label at Bergdorf Goodman. In 1990, the company launched KORS Michael Kors as a licensee. A Chapter 11 filing in 1993, caused by the closure of the licensing partner for KORS Michael Kors, forced him to put the KORS line on hold. He got back on his feet by 1997 and launched a lower priced line and at the same time was named the first women's ready-to-wear designer for French house Celine. In his tenure at Celine, Kors turned the fashion house around with successful accessories and a critically acclaimed ready-to-wear line. He left Celine in October 2003 to concentrate on his own brand. He launched his menswear line in 2002.

Among the celebrities who have dressed in Kors' designs are Nicole Kidman, Tiffany Haddish, Reese Witherspoon, Lupita Nyong'o, Olivia Wilde, Blake Lively, Kate Hudson, Jennifer Lawrence, Taylor Swift, Kate Middleton, Hillary Clinton, Angelina Jolie, Jennifer Lopez,  Emily Blunt, Kristen Stewart, Ariana DeBose, Vice President Kamala Harris, Heidi Klum, Catherine Zeta-Jones, Sigourney Weaver and Ciara. Michelle Obama wore a black sleeveless dress from the designer for her first term official portrait as First Lady and later sported Kors again at the 2015 State of the Union address.

Viola Davis wore a custom Michael Kors Collection gown when accepting a Golden Globe for best supporting actress in a motion picture for her role in Fences. Kate Hudson and Olivia Wilde both wore gowns by the designer to the 2016 Golden Globes, and Emily Blunt, nominated for her role in Into The Woods, wore a white custom gown by the designer in 2015. Joan Allen wore his gown when she was nominated for an Academy Award for Best Actress for her role in The Contender. As creative director of Celine, Kors designed many outfits for actresses to wear on screen, including Gwyneth Paltrow in Possession; and Rene Russo in The Thomas Crown Affair.

One of his gowns was worn by Alicia Keys for her performance at Barack Obama's inaugural ball on January 21, 2013.

Kors was a judge on the Emmy-nominated reality television program Project Runway, which aired on Bravo for five seasons; subsequent seasons aired on Lifetime. On December 18, 2012, it was announced that Kors would be leaving Project Runway, to be replaced by fellow designer Zac Posen. Kors returned to Project Runway in 2016 as a guest judge on the season 15 finale.

In January 2014, Forbes reported that Kors reached a personal fortune in excess of $1 billion. Michael Kors Holdings had already "minted two billionaires": Silas Chou and Lawrence Stroll.

Other honors 

 2016: The World Food Program USA honored Kors with the McGovern-Dole Leadership award, presented by Vice President Joe Biden.
 2015: Named a Global Ambassador Against Hunger for the United Nations World Food Programme.
 2015: God's Love We Deliver dedicated the Michael Kors Building at the non-profit's new SoHo headquarters in honor of Kors' ongoing support.
 2013: Selected for The Time 100, the magazine's annual list of the 100 most influential people in the world. He also made the New York Observer's list of the 100 Most Influential New Yorkers, under the fashion category, and was named to Out magazine's 2014 Power 50 List.
 2013: Honored with the 2013 Couture Council Award for Artistry of Fashion by The Couture Council of The Museum at the Fashion Institute of Technology.
 2013: Kors presented Hillary Rodham Clinton with the first-ever Michael Kors Award for Outstanding Community service.
 2012: Honored with the Golden Heart Lifetime Achievement Award by God's Love We Deliver, a non-profit organization that distributes fresh meals to people living with HIV/AIDS and other diagnoses, which he has been involved with for over 20 years.
 2010: Received the Oliver R. Grace Award for Distinguished Service in Advancing Cancer Research, an annual honor bestowed by the Cancer Research Institute, a U.S. nonprofit organization dedicated to advancing immune system-based treatments for cancer.
 2010: Kors was the youngest recipient ever of the Geoffrey Beene Lifetime Achievement Award from the Council of Fashion Designers of America (CFDA) and received the Fragrance Foundation's FiFi Award for Lifetime Achievement.

Legal issues 

In January 2009, the estate of the artist-designer Tony Duquette sued Kors for trademark infringement after Kors allegedly used Duquette's name and images in promoting Kors' 2009 resortwear collection.

In July 2013, he became the second luxury brand, after Tiffany & Co, to sue Costco for falsely claiming in advertisements that they sold his product.

In popular culture 
 Kors was referenced in the 2006 film The Devil Wears Prada by Meryl Streep's character, Miranda Priestly. In the scene, Priestly sweeps into her office and gives a list of instructions to her personal assistant (Emily Blunt). Priestly says, "RSVP 'yes' to Michael Kors' party and I want the driver to drop me off at 9:30 and pick me up at 9:45 sharp."
Nicki Minaj mentions Kors in Big Sean's song "Dance"
Drake mentions Michael Kors in his song "From Time"
Pusha T in his song "Numbers on the Boards"
Kors guest starred as himself in a Fashion Week themed episode of the hit teen show Gossip Girl; show repeatedly showcases several pieces from his collections.

See also 
 High culture
 List of LGBT people from New York City
 New York Fashion Week

References

External links 
 Official website

1959 births
20th-century American Jews
21st-century American Jews
American billionaires
American fashion businesspeople
American fashion designers
American people of Jewish descent
American people of Swedish descent
Businesspeople from New York (state)
Eyewear brands of the United States
Fashion Institute of Technology alumni
Gay men
LGBT fashion designers
LGBT Jews
LGBT people from New York (state)
Living people
Jewish fashion designers
John F. Kennedy High School (Bellmore, New York) alumni
People from Bellmore, New York
People from Merrick, New York
Judges in American reality television series